is a Japanese manga artist most notable for providing the illustrations for the Kentarō Katayama's light novel series Kure-nai, as well as creating the related manga. Yamamoto has also been the illustrator for the manga series Seraph of the End.

Works
9S vol. 1–9, SS, Memories (light novel)
Denpa teki na Kanojo vol. 1–3 (light novel)
Kure-nai vol. 1–4 (light novel)
Kure-nai vol. 1–10 (manga, Jump SQ.)
Seraph of the End, vol. 1–21, present (manga Jump SQ)

References

External links
  
 Yamato Yamamoto manga at Media Arts Database 

Japanese illustrators
Living people
1983 births
Manga artists from Ibaraki Prefecture